John "Picayune" Butler (died 1864) was a black French singer and banjo player who lived in New Orleans, Louisiana. He came to New Orleans from the French West Indies in the 1820s. One of his influences was Old Corn Meal, a street vendor who had gained fame as a singer and dancer at the St. Charles Theatre in 1837. By the 1820s, Butler had begun touring the Mississippi Valley performing music and clown acts. His fame grew so that by the 1850s he was known as far north as Cincinnati. In 1857, Butler participated in the first banjo tournament in the United States held at New York City's Chinese Hall, but due to inebriation, he only placed second. Butler is one of the first documented black entertainers to have influenced American popular music. He influenced blackface entertainers most directly. Circus performer George Nichols took his song "Picayune Butler Is Going Away" from him and claimed to have learned "Jump Jim Crow" from Butler. The blackface song "Picayune Butler's Come to Town", published in 1858, was named for him.

Notes

References
Knowles, Mark (2002). Tap Roots: The Early History of Tap Dancing. Jefferson, North Carolina: McFarland & Company, Publishers. .
Meredith, Sarah (2003). With a Banjo On Her Knee: Gender, Race, Class, and the American Classical Banjo Tradition. Florida State University.
Southern, Eileen (1996). "Black Musicians and Early Ethiopian Minstrelsy", Inside the Minstrel Mask: Readings in Modern Minstrelsy. Middletown, Connecticut: Wesleyan University Press. .
Toll, Robert C. (1974). Blacking Up: The Minstrel Show in Nineteenth-century America. New York: Oxford University Press. .
Watkins, Mel (1999). On the Real Side: A History of African American Comedy from Slavery to Chris Rock. Chicago, Illinois: Lawrence Hill Books. .

19th-century African-American male singers
American banjoists
Blackface minstrel performers
Musicians from New Orleans
American street performers
Year of birth unknown
1864 deaths
Singers from Louisiana